The Coupe de France féminine de handball is an annual national cup competition for French women's handball clubs. Its champion used to qualify for the EHF Cup Winners' Cup and now qualifies for the Women's EHF European League. Organized by the French Handball Federation, it first took place in 1985 but it has been discontinued in several occasions.

Metz Handball is the competition's most successful club as of 2022 with 10 titles, followed by ES Besançon with four.

Champions

Winners by season 

 1985  USM Gagny
 1986  Stade Français d'Issy
 1987  Stade Français d'Issy
 1988 not held
 1989 not held
 1990  ASPTT Metz
 1991 not held
 1992  USM Gagny
 1993  USM Gagny
 1994  ASPTT Metz
 1995 not held
 1996 not held
 1997 not held
 1998  ASPTT Metz
 1999  ASPTT Metz
 2000 not held
 2001  ES Besançon
 2002  ES Besançon
 2003  ES Besançon
 2004 not held
 2005  ES Besançon
 2006  Le Havre AC

 2007  Le Havre AC
 2008 not held
 2009  Mios Biganos Handball
 2010  Metz Handball
 2011  Toulon Handball
 2012  Toulon Handball
 2013  Metz Handball
 2014  CJF Fleury Loiret
 2015  Metz Handball
 2016  Brest Bretagne Handball
 2017  Metz Handball
 2018  Brest Bretagne Handball
 2019  Metz Handball (9)
 2020 cancelled
 2021  Brest Bretagne Handball
 2022  Metz Handball (10)

Performances 

 Legend :  10 cups won ; (T) : title holder

References

Handball competitions in France
Recurring sporting events established in 1985
1985 establishments in France